Latter Days is a 2003 American romance film.

Latter Days may also refer to:

 Latter Days (comics), a graphic novel in the Cerebus series
 Latter Days: Best of Led Zeppelin Volume Two, a compilation album
 Latter days, a term for the end time used in Abrahamic religions
 Latter Day of the Law, one of the Three Ages of Buddhism 
 "Latter Days", a song by American band Big Red Machine featuring Anaïs Mitchell from the album How Long Do You Think It's Gonna Last?

See also 
 Latter Day Saint movement